The North Brunswick Township Public Schools is a comprehensive community public school district that serve students in pre-kindergarten through twelfth grade from North Brunswick, in Middlesex County, New Jersey, United States.

As of the 2019–20 school year, the district, comprised of six schools, had an enrollment of 6,096 students and 530.0 classroom teachers (on an FTE basis), for a student–teacher ratio of 11.5:1.

The district is classified by the New Jersey Department of Education as being in District Factor Group "FG", the fourth-highest of eight groupings. District Factor Groups organize districts statewide to allow comparison by common socioeconomic characteristics of the local districts. From lowest socioeconomic status to highest, the categories are A, B, CD, DE, FG, GH, I and J.

Awards, recognition and honors
John Adams School was recognized in 1998-99 by the National Blue Ribbon Schools Program. The district's high school was recognized in 1999-2000.

Schools
Schools in the district (with 2019–20 enrollment data from the National Center for Education Statistics) are:
Pre-school
North Brunswick Township Early Childhood Center with NA students in PreK
Scott Passner, Principal
Elementary schools
John Adams Elementary School with 565 students in grades K-4
Ann Kingsley, Principal
Arthur M. Judd Elementary School with 786 students in grades PreK-4
John Petela, Principal
Livingston Park Elementary School with 594 students in grades K-4
Sidney Dawson, Principal
Parsons Elementary School with 703 students in grades K-4
Diana Whalen, Principal
Linwood School with 1,356 students in grades 5-6
Janton "JD" Shorter, Principal
Middle school
North Brunswick Township Middle School with NA students in grades 7-8
High school
North Brunswick Township High School with 1,886 students in grades 9-12
Michael Kneller, Principal

Former and converted schools
The four elementary schools, John Adams Elementary School, Arthur M. Judd Elementary School, Livingston Park Elementary School, and Parsons Elementary School, were all redistricted the summer before the 2008-2009 scholastic year to adjust to the growing population of North Brunswick Township.

On December 13, 2016, a referendum was held to build a new middle school (called North Brunswick Township Middle School) on vacant land at Route 130 and Renaissance Boulevard North, which was passed by voters (1,807 in favor and 1,648 against). Ground was broken in September 2017 with construction expected to be completed in time for the 2020-21 school year. The new middle school will only house 7th and 8th grade students, instead of 6th through 8th.

As a result, Linwood Middle School, which housed grades 6-8, become a 5-6 school (as the district's elementary schools were also overcrowded) and a wing of the school became the Early Childhood Center and the Board of Education office

The prior Early Childhood Center, which was located in nearby Milltown in a building the district has leased, would no longer be used by North Brunswick Schools. The Board of Education office was located in the former Maple Meade School, which will be sold and likely demolished after the offices are moved out and into Linwood School.

Administration
Core members of the district's administration are:
Janet Ciarrocca, Superintendent
Rosa Hock, Business Administrator / Board Secretary

Board of education
The district's board of education, comprised of nine members, sets policy and oversees the fiscal and educational operation of the district through its administration. As a Type II school district, the board's trustees are elected directly by voters to serve three-year terms of office on a staggered basis, with three seats up for election each year held (since 2012) as part of the November general election. The board appoints a superintendent to oversee the district's day-to-day operations and a business administrator to supervise the business functions of the district.

References

External links
North Brunswick Township Public Schools
 
School Data for the North Brunswick Township Public Schools, National Center for Education Statistics

New Jersey District Factor Group FG
North Brunswick, New Jersey
School districts in Middlesex County, New Jersey